The Roman Catholic Diocese of Mopti is a diocese located in the city of Mopti in the Ecclesiastical province of Bamako in Mali. After the death of bishop Georges Fonghoro, the diocese of Mopti is vacant.  On 27 March 2020, Jean-Baptiste Tiama was appointed to this see, with no information yet about installation.

History
 June 9, 1942: Established as Apostolic Prefecture of Gao from the Apostolic Vicariate of Bamako, the Apostolic Vicariate of Bobo-Dioulasso in Burkina Faso and the Apostolic Vicariate of Ouagadougou in Burkina Faso
 September 29, 1964: Promoted as Diocese of Mopti

Leadership
 Prefects Apostolic of Gao (Roman rite)
 Fr. Jean-Marie Lesourd, M. Afr. (1942.08.05 – 1947.10.17), appointed Prefect of Nouna; future Bishop
 Fr. Pierre Louis Leclerc, M. Afr. (1947.10.17 – 1949.12.25), appointed titular bishop and Vicar Apostolic of Bamako; future Archbishop
 Fr. Renato Landru, M. Afr. (1950.07.10 – 1964)
 Bishops of Mopti (Roman rite)
 Bishop Georges Biard, M. Afr. (1964.09.29 – 1988.04.12)
 Bishop Jean Zerbo (1994.12.19 – 1998.06.27), appointed Archbishop of Bamako (Cardinal in 2017)
 Bishop Georges Fonghoro (1999.08.30 - 2016.09.22)
 Bishop Jean-Baptiste Tiama (since 2020.03.27)

See also
Roman Catholicism in Mali

References

External links
 GCatholic.org

Mopti
Mopti
Christian organizations established in 1942
Roman Catholic dioceses and prelatures established in the 20th century
1942 establishments in the French colonial empire
Roman Catholic Ecclesiastical Province of Bamako